The Shuttered Room (a.k.a. Blood Island) is a 1967 British horror film directed by David Greene and starring Gig Young and Carol Lynley as a couple who move into a house with dark secrets. It is based on a short story of the same name by August Derleth, published as a so-called "posthumous collaboration" with H. P. Lovecraft. The film has also been re-released under the title Blood Island.

Although set in the U.S., the film was shot in England, in Kent and Norfolk.

Plot
Susannah Kelton, a newly married woman who was raised in foster care in the city, learns that her real parents have died and left their property to her. She and her husband Mike travel to the island of Dunwich off the coast of Massachusetts to inspect the property.  They find a local culture that is clannish, backward and ignorant. The few friends whom they make among the locals, including Susannah's aunt Agatha, warn them that the family mill is cursed and urge the Keltons to leave immediately and never look back.

Refusing to bow to superstition, the couple consider rebuilding the abandoned mill. They become the target of a gang of local thugs led by Susannah's lecherous cousin, Ethan. Their reign of terror is ended by something still living in the shuttered attic room of the mill, something that caused Susannah to have nightmares as a child.

Cast
Gig Young as Mike Kelton
Carol Lynley as Susannah Whately Kelton / Sarah
Oliver Reed as Ethan
Flora Robson as Aunt Agatha
Judith Arthy as Emma
Rick Jones as Luther Whately
Ann Bell as Mary Whately
William Devlin as Zebulon Whately
Charles Lloyd-Pack as Barge Master
Bernard Kay as Tait
Donald Sutherland as Zebulon (voice)
Celia Hewitt as Aunt Sarah
Robert Cawdron as Luther Whately
Murray Evans as gang member
Clifford Diggins as gang member
Peter Porteous as gang member
Anita Anderson as Susannah as a child

Production
The script was originally written by Alexander Jacobs and Nathaniel Tanchuck. Filming began in April 1966. Sam Peckinpah's Straw Dogs (1971) would have many similarities.

Hollowshore Boatyard and The Shipwright's Arms in Faversham, Kent feature throughout the film, doubling as the town of Dunwich, Massachusetts. South Foreland Lighthouse in Dover also features as the exterior of Aunt Agatha's home.  The film features a large half-brick, half-timber watermill, which is destroyed by fire in the closing scenes. The building used was Hardingham Mill on the River Yare in Norfolk.

References

External links

1967 films
1967 horror films
British horror films
1960s English-language films
Films based on short fiction
Films based on works by H. P. Lovecraft
Films directed by David Greene
Films scored by Basil Kirchin
Films set in Massachusetts
Films set on islands
Films shot in England
1967 directorial debut films
1960s British films